Maksim Konstantinovich Kirsanov (born 8 May 1987) is a Russian former professional football player.

Club career
He played 3 seasons in the Russian Football National League for FC Torpedo Moscow, FC Petrotrest Saint Petersburg and FC Dynamo Saint Petersburg.

External links
 
 

1987 births
Living people
Russian footballers
Russia youth international footballers
Association football defenders
FC Torpedo Moscow players
FC Vityaz Podolsk players
FC Petrotrest players
FC Dynamo Saint Petersburg players
FC Zugdidi players
Russian expatriate footballers
Expatriate footballers in Georgia (country)